Personal Shopper is a 2016 supernatural psychological thriller film written and directed by Olivier Assayas. The film stars Kristen Stewart as a young American woman in Paris who works as a personal shopper for a celebrity and tries to communicate with her deceased twin brother.

An international co-production between Belgium, Czech Republic, France and Germany, the film was selected to compete for the Palme d'Or at the 2016 Cannes Film Festival. At Cannes, Assayas shared the Best Director Award with Cristian Mungiu, who directed Graduation. The film was released on 14 December 2016 in France and 10 March 2017 in the United States. It received positive reviews from critics, with particular praise for Stewart's performance.

Plot
Maureen Cartwright is a personal shopper in Paris for Kyra Gellman, a supermodel. Maureen is waiting for her twin brother, Lewis, who recently died of a genetic heart condition, to fulfill their pact to send a signal from the afterlife. She stays overnight at Lewis's house in hopes of receiving a sign and briefly encounters a spiritual presence. Lewis's girlfriend, Lara, goes with Maureen to meet a couple acquainted with Lewis who are interested in buying the house. The wife mentions the artist Hilma af Klint, whose paintings were inspired by messages from the spirit world. Later, Maureen video chats with her boyfriend, Gary, a contractor in Muscat, Oman, who encourages her to visit him, which she turns down.

The next day, at Kyra's apartment, Maureen meets Ingo, a magazine editor and Kyra's lover. He tells Maureen that Kyra is planning to break up with him out of fear her husband will discover their relationship. Maureen returns to Lewis's house and is disturbed by the bathroom's faucets turning on. After inspecting the house, she finds her drawings have been violently scratched out, and is terrorized by a malefic female specter.

Maureen begins receiving text messages from an unknown sender she initially suspects is Lewis. The messenger encourages her to indulge in forbidden desires, such as wearing Kyra's clothes. Maureen goes to Kyra's place to wear her clothes and masturbates in Kyra's bed. She falls asleep, is awoken by the same female specter, and tells Lara the next morning that there is no longer a supernatural presence in the house.

The enigmatic messenger leaves Maureen a room key for a hotel. Donning one of Kyra's newest dresses, Maureen goes to the room to find it empty. She attempts to investigate the texter's identity by inquiring at the front desk, but the room was paid for in cash and reserved under her name.

Maureen drops off Kyra's jewelry at the apartment, cautiously opens Kyra's bedroom door, and finds Kyra's naked corpse on the bathroom floor. She flees on her motorcycle to the police station, where she is interrogated about her relationship with Kyra but released. She ignores the texter, who demands to know whether Maureen revealed their conversations to the police. Returning to her apartment, Maureen phones Gary to accept his offer to visit Muscat. She discovers Kyra's jewelry in her apartment, despite telling the police she left it at Kyra's place. The texter demands that Maureen return to the hotel room. She does, bringing the jewelry. At the hotel, Maureen seemingly recognizes a clandestine person entering the room. Elevators and doors in the hotel are then shown opening and closing for an invisible entity. Afterward, Ingo is shown leaving the hotel and being apprehended by two policemen. He confesses to Kyra's murder.

Meeting Lara at a café, Maureen asks to stay with her before joining Gary in Oman. The next morning, Maureen meets Erwin, Lara's new boyfriend, who knew Lewis. He leaves for work, and as Maureen sits in the garden alone, a ghostly figure appears in the kitchen holding a glass. The figure disappears and the glass levitates briefly before shattering on the floor.

Maureen flies to Oman to stay with Gary in the mountains. At his retreat, she hears a noise and finds a glass floating in the air; it falls and shatters. She asks yes/no questions aloud, which are answered with one thump for "yes" and two for "no". Getting no response to "Lewis, is it you?", she asks, "Is it just me?", and hears a single thump.

Cast

Production
In May 2015, it was announced that Olivier Assayas would be directing the film from a screenplay he wrote, with Kristen Stewart starring. He wrote it for Stewart after working with her in Clouds of Sils Maria. Charles Gillibert produced the film under his CG Cinema banner. In October 2015, Sigrid Bouaziz, Lars Eidinger, Anders Danielsen Lie, and Nora von Waldstätten were cast in the film. In November 2015, Ty Olwin was cast.

Principal photography began on 27 October 2015 in Paris for two weeks and then moved to Prague, London, and Oman.

Release
The film had its world premiere at the Cannes Film Festival on 17 May 2016, where it competed for the Palme d'Or. The film was distributed by Les Films du Losange in France, and IFC Films in North America. Universal Pictures distributed the film internationally. The film was screened at the 2016 Toronto International Film Festival and the New York Film Festival. It was released in France on 14 December 2016 and in the United States on 10 March 2017.

In the United States, the movie grossed $79,175 in four theaters for an average of $19,794, the highest of the weekend. After adding 31 theaters the next weekend, it grossed $152,478. The movie's final US domestic total was $1,305,195, with a worldwide gross of $2.2 million against a $1 million budget, making it a box-office success.

Critical reception
Personal Shopper received generally positive reviews from film critics. Review aggregator Rotten Tomatoes reports a "Certified Fresh" score of 81% based on 274 reviews with an average rating of 7.2/10. The site's critical consensus reads, "Personal Shopper attempts a tricky series of potentially jarring tonal shifts with varying results, bolstered by a performance from Kristen Stewart that's impossible to ignore." On Metacritic, the film holds a rating of 77 out of 100, based on 38 critics, indicating "generally favorable reviews". The film was booed at its initial screening at the Cannes Film Festival, about which Assayas said, "It happens every  where people just don't get the ending." At its official premiere at Cannes, the film received a -minute standing ovation.

The Guardian awarded the film five stars, calling it "uncategorisable yet undeniably terrifying". Stephanie Zacharek of Time gave a positive review, writing, "Personal Shopper is a strange and beautifully made film, and both star and director are clearly energized by their dual mission." She listed it as one of Time'''s top ten films of 2017. A. O. Scott of The New York Times'' called the film "sleek and spooky, seductive and suspenseful. It flirts with silliness, as ghost stories do. And also with heartbreak."

Accolades

References

External links
 
 
 
 
 Personal Shopper: Freedom 2016 – an essay by Glenn Kenny at The Criterion Collection

2016 films
2016 psychological thriller films
2016 thriller drama films
2010s English-language films
2010s French films
2010s French-language films
2010s German films
2010s ghost films
2010s mystery drama films
2010s mystery thriller films
2010s psychological drama films
2010s supernatural thriller films
2010s Swedish-language films
Arte France Cinéma films
Belgian mystery drama films
Belgian mystery thriller films
Belgian thriller drama films
Czech mystery thriller films
Czech thriller drama films
English-language Belgian films
English-language Czech films
English-language French films
English-language German films
Films about fashion in France
Films about twins
Films directed by Olivier Assayas
Films set in Oman
Films set in Paris
Films shot in London
Films shot in Oman
Films shot in Paris
Films shot in Prague
Films with screenplays by Olivier Assayas
French haunted house films
French mystery drama films
French mystery thriller films
French psychological drama films
French psychological thriller films
French thriller drama films
French-language Belgian films
French-language Czech films
German ghost films
German mystery drama films
German mystery thriller films
German psychological drama films
German psychological thriller films
German thriller drama films
Supernatural drama films